Vashchenko, also transliterated Vaschenko, is a Ukrainian-language surname. Notable people with the surname include:

 Mikhail Vaschenko-Zakharchenko (1825–1912), Ukrainian mathematician
 Roman Vashchenko (born 2000), Ukrainian gymnast
 Viktor Vashchenko (born 1965), Russian footballer
 Yulia Vashchenko (born 1978), Ukrainian footballer

See also
 
 

Ukrainian-language surnames